Al-Asmaʿi (ʿAbd al-Malik ibn Qurayb al-Aṣmaʿī ;  -828/833 CE), or Asmai; an early philologist and one of three leading Arabic grammarians of the Basra school.  Celebrated at the court of the Abbasid caliph, Hārūn al-Rashīd,  as polymath and prolific author on philology, poetry, genealogy, and natural science, he pioneered zoology studies  in animal-human anatomical science. He compiled an important poetry anthology, the Asma'iyyat, and was credited with composing an epic on the life of Antarah ibn Shaddad. A protégé of Al-Khalil ibn Ahmad al-Farahidi and Abu 'Amr ibn al-'Ala', he was a contemporary and rival of Abū ʿUbaidah and Sibawayhi also of the Basran school.

Ibn Isḥaq al-Nadīm's c.10th biography of al-Aṣma’ī follows the “isnad” narrative or ‘chain-of-transmission’ tradition. Al-Nadīm reports Abū ‘Abd Allāh ibn Muqlah's written report  of Tha’lab's report, giving Al-Aṣma’ī‘s full name as ’’‘Abd al-Malik ibn Qurayb ibn ‘Abd al-Malik ibn ‘Ali ibn Aṣma’ī ibn Muẓahhir ibn ‘Amr ibn ‘Abd Allah al-Bāhilī.’’’

The celebrated c.13th biographer Ibn Khallikān calls al-Aṣmaʿī “a complete master of the Arabic language,” and “the most eminent of all transmitters of the oral history and rare expressions of the language.”. His account includes collected anecdotes of numerous adventures.

Biography
His father was Qurayb Abū Bakr from ‘Āṣim and his son was Sa’īd.  He belonged to the family of the celebrated poet Abū ‘Uyaynah al-Muhallabī. Al-Aṣma’ī was descended from Adnān  and the tribe of Bahila.  The governor of Basra brought him to the notice of the caliph, Harun al-Rashid, who made him tutor to his sons, Al-Amin and Al-Ma'mun.  It was said Al-Rashid was an insomniac, and that he once held an all-night discussion with al-Asmaʿi on pre-Islamic and early Arabic poetry. Al-Aṣma’ī was popular with the influential Barmakid viziers  and acquired wealth as a property owner in Basra. Some of his protégés attained high rank as literary men. Among his students was the noted musician Ishaq al-Mawsili.

His ambitious aim to catalogue the complete Arabic language in its purest form, led to a period he spent roaming with desert Bedouin tribes, observing and recording their speech patterns.

Rivalry between Al-Aṣma’ī and Abū ‘Ubaida
His great critic Abū ʿUbaida was a member of the Shu'ubiyya movement, a chiefly Persian cultural movement. Al-Aṣma’ī, as an Arab nationalist and champion of the Arabic language, rejected foreign linguistic and literary influences.

Al-Nadīm cites a report of Abū ‘Ubaida that al-Aṣma’ī claimed his father travelled on a horse of Salm ibn Qutaybah.  Abū ‘Ubaida had exclaimed,

“Praise be to Allāh and thanks to Allāh, for Allāh is greater [than His creatures]. One boasting of what he does not own is like a person wearing a false robe and, by Allāh the father of al-Aṣma’ī never owned any animal other than the one inside of his robe!"

Ubaida’s reference here to al-Asma’ī’s father seems to relate to the story given by Khallikān about al-Asma’ī’s grandfather, Alī ibn Asmā, who had lost his fingers in punishment for theft.

A corollary to 'Ubaida’s anecdote is related by Khallikān, that once al-Faḍl Ibn Rabī, the vizier to caliph al-Rashid, had brought forth his horse and asked both Al-Aṣma’ī and Abū 'Ubaida (who had written extensively on the horse) to identify each part of its anatomy. Abū 'Ubaida excused himself from the challenge, saying that he was an expert on Bedouin culture not a farrier; When al-Aṣma’ī then grabbed the horse by the mane, named each part of its body while, at the same time, reciting the Bedouin verses that authenticated each term as proper to the Arabic lexicon, Al-Faḍl had rewarded him the horse.  Whenever after this, Aṣma’ī visited Ubaida he rode his horse.   Al-Aṣma’ī, was a perennial bachelor and when Yahya, a Barmakid vizier of the caliph, presented him with the gift of a slave girl, the girl was so repulsed by Al-Aṣma’ī's appearance, Yahya bought her back.

Shaykh Abū Sa’īd reported that Abū al-‘Abbas al-Mubarrad had said al-Aṣma’ī and Abū ‘Ubaida were equal in poetry and rhetoric, but where Abū ‘Ubaida excelled in genealogy, al-Aṣma’ī excelled in grammar – “al-Aṣma’ī, [like] a nightingale [would] charm them with his melodies”

Al-Aṣma’ī died, aged 88 years  in Baṣra, ca. 213/828 - 217/832, in the company of the blind poet and satirist Abū al-‘Aynā'.  His funeral prayers were said by his nephew and poet ‘Abd al-Raḥmān: "To Allāh we belong and to Him we return."

Works
Al-Aṣma’ī's magnum opus Asma'iyyat, is a unique primary source of early Arabic poetry and was collected and republished in the modern era, by the German orientalist Wilhelm Ahlwardt. Al-Sayyid Muʻaẓẓam Ḥusain's English translation of selected poems taken from both the Aṣma’īyyat and Mufaddaliyyat- the larger important source of pre-Islamic Arabic poetry- is available online. Most other existing collections were compiled by al-Aṣma’ī's students based on the principles he taught. 

Of al-Aṣma’ī's prose works listed in the Fihrist about half a dozen are extant. These include the Book of Distinction, the Book of the Wild Animals, the Book of the Horse, and the Book of the Sheep, and Fuḥūlat al-Shu‘arā  a pioneering work of Arabic literary criticism.

Disposition of Man or Humanity - Kitab Khalaq al-Insan
Categories
Al-Anwā’ – “Influence of the stars on the weather”
Marking with the Hamzah)
Short and Long
Distinction, or of Rare Animals - Kitab al-Farq
Eternal Attributes [of God]
Gates or Merit
Al-Maysir and al-Qidāḥ
Disposition of the Horse
Horses - Kitāb al-Khail
The Camel - Kitāb al-Ibil
Sheep - Kitāb al-Shā
Tents and Houses
Wild Beasts - Kitab al-Wuhush
Times
Fa‘ala wa-Af‘ala [gram.])
Proverbs
Antonyms
Pronunciations/Dialects
Weapons
Languages/Vernaculars
Etymology
Rare Words
Origins of Words
Change and Substitution [gram.]
The Arabian Peninsula
The Utterance/Pail)
Migration
The Meaning of Poetry
Infinitive/Verbal Noun
The Six Poems 
Rajaz Poems
Date Palm/Creed
Plants and Trees
The Land Tax
Synonyms
The Strange in the Ḥadīth
The Saddle, Bridle, Halter and Horse Shoe
The Strange in the Ḥadīth-Uncultured Words
Rare Forms of the Arabians/Inflections/Declensions
Waters of the Arabs
Genealogy 
Vocal Sounds 
Masculine and Feminine
The Seasons

Contribution to Early Arabic Literature

Al-Aṣma’ī was among a group of scholars who edited and recited the Pre-lslāmic and Islāmic poets of the Arab tribes up to the era of the Banū al-‘Abbās

He memorised thousands of verses of rajaz poetry and edited a substantial portion of the canon of Arab poets, but produced little poetry of his own. .  He met criticism for neglecting the ‘rare forms’ (nawādir  - ) and lack of care in his abridgments.

List of Edited Poets

Al-Nābighah al-Dhubyānī (whom he also abridged) 
Al-Ḥuṭay’ah
Al-Nābighah al-Ja‘dī
Labīd ibn Rabī‘ah al-‘Āmirī
Tamīm ibn Ubayy ibn Muqbil
Durayd ibn al-Ṣimmah
Muhalhil ibn Rabī‘ah
Al-A‘shā al-Kabīr, Maymūn ibn Qays, Abū Baṣīr:
A‘shā Bāhilah ‘Amir ibn al-Ḥārith
Mutammim ibn Nuwayrah
Bishr ibn Abī Khāzim
Al-Zibraqān ibn Badr al-Tamīmī
Al-Mutalammis Jarīr ibn ‘Abd al-Masīḥ
Ḥumayd ibn Thawr al-Rājiz
Ḥumayd al-Arqaṭ
Suhaym ibn Wathīl al-Riyāḥī
Urwah ibn al-Ward
‘Amr ibn Sha’s
Al-Namir ibn Tawlab
Ubayd Allāh ibn Qays al-Ruqayyāt 
Muḍarras ibn Rib‘ī
Abū Ḥayyah al-Numayrī

Al-Kumayt ibn Ma‘rūf 
Al-‘Ajjāj al-Rājaz, Abū Shāthā’ ‘Abd Allāh ibn Ru’bah.. For his son, see Ru’bah.
Ru’bah ibn al-‘Ajjāj, called Abū Muḥammad Ru’bah ibn ‘Abd Allāh , was a contemporary of al-Aṣma’ī whose poetry al-Aṣma’ī recited.
Jarīr ibn ‘Aṭīyah al-Aṣma’ī was among group of editors who included Abū ‘Amr [al-Shaybānī], and Ibn al-Sikkīt.

See also

List of Arab scientists and scholars
Encyclopædia Britannica Online

Notes

External links
 .
 .

References

Sources
 
 
 
 
 
 
 
 
 
 
 
 
 
 
 
 

 

 
 
 
 
 
 
 
 

 
 
 
 
 
 
 
 
 
 
 
 
 
 
 
 
 
 

740s births
828 deaths
8th-century Arabic writers
8th-century philologists
8th-century scientists
9th-century Arabic writers
9th-century biologists
9th-century botanists
9th-century  lexicographers

9th-century linguists
9th-century philologists

9th-century scientists

9th-century zoologists
9th-century historians from the Abbasid Caliphate
Arab lexicographers
Arabists
Arab linguists
Bahila
Botanists of the medieval Islamic world
Grammarians of Arabic
Grammarians of Basra
Iraqi botanists
Iraqi genealogists

Iraqi lexicographers

Iraqi philologists
Iraqi zoologists

Linguists from Iraq

Medieval grammarians of Arabic
One Thousand and One Nights characters

Poets from the Abbasid Caliphate

Zoologists of the medieval Islamic world